Braeside is a residential neighbourhood in the southwest quadrant of Calgary, Alberta. It is located north of Anderson Road, south of Southland Drive, west of 14th Street SW and east of 24th Street SW.

Demographics

As of 2000, 20.5% of the residents were immigrants. A proportion of 10.6% of the buildings were condominiums or apartments, and 19.6% of the housing was used for renting.

Education 
Braeside is served by the Braeside Elementary public school. A Junior High School, John Ware, is located immediately north of the community. CBE Students are served by Eugene Coste school in Haysboro if they want to attend a Spanish bilingual school. The nearest French immersion school is Chinook Park. The nearest high school is Henry Wise Wood. JCB.

See also
List of neighbourhoods in Calgary

References

External links
Federation of Calgary Communities - Braeside  Community

Neighbourhoods in Calgary